The following is a list of Registered Historic Places in Branch County, Michigan.



|}

See also

List of Michigan State Historic Sites in Branch County, Michigan
National Register of Historic Places listings in Michigan
Listings in neighboring counties: Calhoun, Hillsdale, Kalamazoo, LaGrange (IN), St. Joseph, Steuben

References

Branch County
Branch County, Michigan
Buildings and structures in Branch County, Michigan